Trou au Natron (French: "hole of natron") or  (Teda: "big hole") is a volcanic caldera of the Tibesti Massif in the nation of Chad in Northern Africa. The volcano is extinct. It is unknown when it last erupted. Its volcano number is 0205–01. Trou au Natron is located just south-east of Toussidé, the westernmost volcano of the Tibesti Mountains. Its edge cuts into the nearby Yirrigue caldera.

Geology 
Four smaller volcanic cones, made of scoria or andesitic tuff sit on the floor of the caldera. Numerous smaller vents and hot springs on the caldera's floor emit hot steam and mineral water.

Because of its irregular shape, it has been theorized that the caldera was formed as a result of multiple massive explosions, each of which deepened the enormous pit. Its exact period of formation is unconfirmed, although a Pleistocene formation has been suggested. It is known to be one of the youngest formations on the Tibesti Massif.

Much of the surface of the caldera is lined with a white crust of carbonate salts such as sodium carbonite and natrolite. This substance is also known as natron, leading to the French name for the site. This crust is sometimes known as the Tibesti Soda Lake. The crusts are formed when mineral-rich steam is emitted from small vents on the crater's floor. When this water evaporates in the desert heat, the minerals remain behind as part of the crust.

Both the slopes and the floor of the caldera contain thick layers of fossilized aquatic gastropods and diatoms, indicating that the caldera was once home to a deep lake. Radiocarbon dating on some of these samples indicates an age of approximately 14,500–15,000 years Before Present.

Gallery

References 

Tibesti Mountains
Volcanoes of Chad